Gigan (also romanized as Gīgān) is a village in Abreis Rural District, Bazman District, Iranshahr County, Sistan and Baluchestan Province, Iran. At the 2006 census, its population was 52, in 13 families.

References 

Populated places in Iranshahr County